The Syracuse and Utica Railroad was chartered May 1, 1836, and had to pay the state for any freight displaced from the Erie Canal. The full line opened July 4, 1839, extending the line further to Syracuse, New York to Rome, New York (and further to Auburn, New York via the already-opened Auburn and Syracuse Railroad). The road was consolidated into the New York Central Railroad in 1853.

References

External links 
 The Central New York Modelers.
 Oneida County Historical Society Year Book,  Vol. 1 1881 pages 144 through 155. Transcribed by Richard Palmer - Street scene in Utica about 1850, thought to be the engine "Lightening".

Predecessors of the New York Central Railroad
Defunct railroads in Syracuse, New York
Defunct New York (state) railroads
Railway companies established in 1836
Railway lines opened in 1839
Railway companies disestablished in 1853
1836 establishments in New York (state)
1853 disestablishments in New York (state)